Thomas Charles Sawyer (born August 15, 1945) is an American politician who represented his hometown of Akron, Ohio on all levels of government for nearly fifty years. Previously, he served in the United States Congress, in the Ohio Senate, in the Ohio House of Representatives and as the Mayor of Akron. He is a Democrat.

Early life
Sawyer was born in Akron, Ohio. After graduating from Buchtel High School in Akron, Sawyer received a bachelor of arts degree from the University of Akron in 1968. He also joined the Alpha Phi chapter of Phi Kappa Tau fraternity. Later, Sawyer earned a master of arts degree from Akron in 1970. He worked as an English teacher before seeking political office.

Mayor of Akron 
In November 1983, Tom Sawyer defeated the incumbent Republican Mayor of Akron, Roy Ray, in a close election. Sawyer was the first Democrat to be elected Mayor of Akron in over 18 years. No Republican has held the mayor's seat in Akron since Sawyer upset Ray in 1983.

On December 20, 1984, during Sawyer's first year as mayor, an explosion at the Akron Recycle Energy System plant caused the deaths of three people. Sawyer helped manage the aftermath of the tragedy and assisted in the investigation. Speaking to the New York Times, Sawyer noted that S&W Waste, of Kearny, N.J., had sent the Akron plant waste materials containing highly flammable chemicals on the day of the explosions.
During his time as mayor he was arrested for a DUI.

United States Congress 
Sawyer successfully ran for US Congress in the 1986 midterm elections and took office on January 3, 1987. He would then serve eight terms in Congress.

Congressman Sawyer gained notoriety as Chairman of the House subcommittee overseeing the 1990 census. He made national news with his study of the 1990 census and subsequent determination that it had failed to count at least 2 million black Americans. Sawyer and others then attempted to readjust the census figures to include a more accurate count of black Americans and the US population as a whole. These efforts were met with stiff opposition. When the Secretary of Commerce refused to adjust the census totals, Congressman Sawyer called the decision a "gerrymander on a national scale."

Notable votes 
In 1993, Sawyer voted for President Bill Clinton's federal budget bill.

Sawyer voted against the Welfare Reform Act of 1996.

He also voted against the impeachment of President Clinton. On the House floor during this debate, Sawyer quoted Sir Thomas More in defense of Clinton and in condemnation of the Congressional impeachment proceedings.

Sawyer voted against authorization for the deployment of United States armed forces in Iraq.

One of the most controversial votes cast by Tom Sawyer during his time in the U.S. House of Representatives was his vote for the North American Free Trade Agreement (NAFTA). Sawyer called his vote "the toughest decision I've ever had to make in public life."

Exit from Congress

2002 primary campaign 
A round of redistricting following the 2000 census redrew Ohio's congressional map. The state lost a seat in the U.S. House of Representatives. A newly configured district, the 17th, placed large parts of Youngstown in the same district as parts of Akron. The new district most closely resembled the one recently vacated by U.S. Representative Jim Traficant, who had been convicted on corruption charges and sent to federal prison. Traficant's protege, State Senator Tim Ryan, defeated Tom Sawyer in a late upset. Sawyer outspent Ryan 6-1, but ultimately lost the election. Despite maintaining high pro-union ratings throughout his career, Sawyer's vote for NAFTA is often credited at the reason Tim Ryan defeated the 8-term Congressman.

2006 primary campaign 

Sawyer again sought to return to Congress during the 2006 Democratic primary. He aimed to replace then-Congressman Sherrod Brown in the 13th district, after Brown vacated the seat to run for the US Senate. However, former State Representative Betty Sutton won an 8-way primary and went on to win the general election with support from national Democrats and EMILY's List.

Ohio Senate
When Akron-based State Senator Kim Zurz was appointed to run the Ohio Department of Commerce in Spring of 2007, Sawyer was selected by legislative leaders to fill the vacancy.

As a member of the Ohio Senate Controlling Board, Sawyer voted to adopt Medicaid expansion in Ohio. Ohio's Medicaid expansion covered thousands of Ohioans who previously did not have insurance. The state share costs were offset by small insurance and sales taxes.

During the 130th and 131st General Assemblies, Sawyer jointly sponsored resolutions with Republican Senator Frank LaRose to reform the drawing of legislative district lines in Ohio. The House and Senate eventually passed a version of the senators' proposal and sent it to the Ohio voters as State Issue 1 in November 2015. The resolution passed with 71% of the vote. This law, once implemented, will end the practice of gerrymandering (partisan drawing of legislative district lines) for Ohio legislative districts. Senators Sawyer and LaRose are currently working on a measure that would end gerrymandering at the Congressional level in Ohio as well.

During the 131st General Assembly, Senator Sawyer helped the legislature adopt House Bill 2 - which was a version of Sawyer's Senate Bill 148 - to reform Ohio's charter school oversight laws.

In the November 2008 general election, Sawyer held his Senate seat by defeating Republican James Carr.

In 2012, Sawyer was elected to a second full term, defeating Republican Robert Roush 71.5% to 28.5%. He served as Ranking Member of the Senate Finance Committee from 2012-14.

Sawyer's tenure in the Ohio Senate concluded at the end of 2016. The state's term limit rules barred Sawyer from seeking the seat for a third consecutive term. He was replaced by Democrat Vernon Sykes.

Committee assignments 
Committee on Education (Ranking Member)
Committee on Finance (Previously served as Ranking Member)
Committee on Public Utilities   
Joint Education Oversight Committee

Legislative commissions 
 Ohio Constitutional Modernization Commission
 School Facilities Construction Commission
 Controlling Board

Personal life 
Sawyer and his wife Joyce have one child and reside in Akron.

Electoral history

*Italics indicate incumbent

See also 
 List of United States representatives from Ohio

References

External links
Vote Tom Sawyer, official campaign website

Project Vote Smart - Senator Thomas C. 'Tom' Sawyer (OH) profile
Follow the Money - Thomas C. Sawyer
2006 campaign contributions

1945 births
Living people
Democratic Party Ohio state senators
Democratic Party members of the Ohio House of Representatives
University of Akron alumni
Mayors of Akron, Ohio
20th-century American politicians
21st-century American politicians
Candidates in the 2006 United States elections
Western Reserve Academy alumni
Democratic Party members of the United States House of Representatives from Ohio